Tark (also Romanized as Tork) is a city in Kandovan District of Mianeh County, East Azerbaijan province, Iran. At the 2006 census, its population was 1,869 in 456 households. The following census in 2011 counted 2,406 people in 532 households. The latest census in 2016 showed a population of 2,031 people in 602 households.

References 

Meyaneh County

Cities in East Azerbaijan Province

Populated places in East Azerbaijan Province

Populated places in Meyaneh County